Garr may refer to:
Allen Garr, journalist, author, and journalism instructor based in Vancouver, British Columbia, Canada
Dixie Garr (born 1956), African-American computer engineer
Ralph Garr (born 1945), former Major League Baseball player
Teri Garr (born 1944), American actress
Garr King (born 1936), judge of the U.S. District Court for the District of Oregon

In fiction
Garr Kelvin, a character in the video game Tales of Destiny
Garr (Breath of Fire), a character in the video game series Breath of Fire

See also
Georgia Radio Reading Service, or GARRS
Gar (disambiguation)
Garre (disambiguation)
GARR (Gruppo per l'Armonizzazione delle Reti della Ricerca, i.e. Research Networks Armonization Group), the Italian national research and education network

Given names